Tanhuato is a municipality in the Mexican state of Michoacán, located approximately  northwest of the state capital of Morelia.

Geography
It borders the Michoacanese municipalities of Yurécuaro to the east, Ecuandureo to the southeast, Ixtlán to the southwest, and Vista Hermosa to the west. Additionally, the Lerma River forms the border between Tanhuato and the Jaliscan municipalities of Ayotlán to the northeast and La Barca to the northwest.

As of 2009, the land cover in Tanhuato consists of tropical forest (31%) and grassland (9%). More than half (57%) of the land is used for agriculture and 1.9% consists of urban areas. The main soil types are vertisols (74%) and phaeozems (23%).

Tanhuato has a temperate climate with rain in the summer.

History
The place name Tanhuato is of Chichimeca origin, meaning "near the hill". In pre-Hispanic times the area was part of the Tarascan state.

Tanhuato was one of the original municipalities established in Michoacán in 1831. The municipality was disestablished and incorporated into Yurécuaro at various periods in the 19th century (1856–1861, 1863–1868, and 1874–1877). In 1902, the municipal seat was renamed Tanhuato de Guerrero in honour of former Mexican president Vicente Guerrero.

Administration
The municipal government of Tanhuato comprises a president, a councillor (Spanish: síndico), and seven trustees (regidores), four elected by relative majority and three by proportional representation. The current president of the municipality is Héctor Daniel Aranda Pérez.

Demographics
In the 2010 Mexican Census, the municipality of Tanhuato recorded a population of 15,176 inhabitants living in 3767 households. The 2015 Intercensal Survey estimated a population of 15,352 inhabitants in Tanhuato.

INEGI lists 18 localities in the municipality, of which only the municipal seat Tanhuato de Guerrero is classified as urban. It recorded a population of 9546 inhabitants in the 2010 Census.

Economy and infrastructure
Agriculture is the main economic activity in Tanhuato. Major crops grown include wheat, sorghum, corn, vegetables (e.g., chiles and hydroponically grown tomatoes), blue agave and beans. Tanhuato is particularly known for its alfalfa and chickpea production. Livestock raised include cattle, pigs, goats, poultry and bees.

The toll expressway Federal Highway 15D runs through the municipality, as does Federal Highway 110.

References

Municipalities of Michoacán
1831 establishments in Mexico
States and territories established in 1831